Christopher Williams (born 10 November 1981 in Brisbane) is an Australian racing cyclist riding for . He rode in the 2016 Milan–San Remo.

References

External links

1981 births
Living people
Australian male cyclists
Cyclists from Brisbane